is a Japanese Nippon Professional Baseball player. A pitcher, he is currently with the Hiroshima Toyo Carp in Japan's Central League.

Notes and references

External links

Living people
1985 births
Baseball people from Yokohama
Japanese baseball players
Nippon Professional Baseball pitchers
Hiroshima Toyo Carp players